The 2003 ECAC Hockey Men's Ice Hockey Tournament was the 42nd tournament in league history. It was played between March 7 and March 22, 2003. First Round and Quarterfinal games were played at home team campus sites, while the final four games were played at the Pepsi Arena in Albany, New York. By winning the tournament, Cornell received the ECAC's automatic bid to the 2003 NCAA Division I Men's Ice Hockey Tournament.

The 2003 Tournament was the first to include 4 rounds of play as well as all member schools of ECAC Hockey in the postseason championship.

Format
The tournament featured four rounds of play. The teams that finish above fifth place in the standings receive a bye to the quarterfinal round. In the first round, the fifth and twelfth seeds, the sixth and eleventh seeds, the seventh and tenth seeds and the eighth and ninth seeds played a best-of-three series with the winners advancing to the quarterfinals. In the quarterfinals the one seed plays the lowest remaining seed, the second seed plays the second-lowest remaining seed, the third seed plays the third-lowest remaining seed and the fourth seed plays the fourth-lowest remaining seed in another best-of-three series with the winners of these the series advancing to the Semifinals. In the semifinals, the top remaining seed plays the lowest remaining seed while the two remaining teams play against each other. The winners of the semifinals play in the championship game while the losers play in a third-place game. All series after the quarterfinals are single-elimination games. The tournament champion receives an automatic bid to the 2003 NCAA Men's Division I Ice Hockey Tournament.

Conference standings
Note: GP = Games played; W = Wins; L = Losses; T = Ties; PTS = Points; GF = Goals For; GA = Goals Against

Bracket
Teams are reseeded after the first round and quarterfinals

Note: * denotes overtime period(s)

First round

(5) Brown vs. (12) Princeton

(6) Union vs. (11) Rensselaer

(7) Clarkson vs. (10) Vermont

(8) Colgate vs. (9) St. Lawrence

Quarterfinals

(1) Cornell vs. (11) Rensselaer

(2) Harvard vs. (10) Vermont

(3) Dartmouth vs. (7) Colgate

(4) Yale vs. (5) Brown

Semifinals

(1) Cornell vs. (5) Brown

(2) Harvard vs. (3) Dartmouth

Third place

(3) Dartmouth vs. (5) Brown

Championship

(1) Cornell vs. (2) Harvard

Tournament awards

All-Tournament Team

F Stephen Bâby (Cornell)
F Dominic Moore (Harvard)
F Brendan Bernakevitch (Harvard)
D Douglas Murray (Cornell)
D Travis Bell (Cornell)
G Dov Grumet-Morris (Harvard)
G Yann Danis (Brown)

Tournament Three Stars
3 Tyler Kolarik (Harvard)
2 Kent Gillings (Dartmouth)
1 Sam Paolini (Cornell)

MOP
 David LeNeveu (Cornell)

Tournament notes 

 In the first game of the quarterfinals Colgate defeated Dartmouth 4-3 in four overtimes the longest game in tournament history.

References

External links
ECAC Hockey

ECAC Hockey Men's Ice Hockey Tournament
ECAC tournament